Abantis cassualalla, the Kavango skipper, is a species of butterfly in the family Hesperiidae. It is found in Angola and northern Namibia. The habitat consists of very dry savanna.

Adults feed from the flowers of trees in spring. They are on wing from September to June. There are seasonal forms.

The larvae feed on Grewia species

References

Butterflies described in 1911
Tagiadini